The Lord High Admiral (of England beginning in the 14th century, later of Great Britain and then the United Kingdom) is the ceremonial head of the Royal Navy. Most have been courtiers or members of the British royal family, and not professional naval officers. The office of Lord High Admiral is one of the nine English Great Officers of State.

History
In 1385 Richard, Earl of Arundel, was appointed Admiral of England, uniting the offices of Admiral of the North and Admiral of the West, dating from 1294. From 1388 the offices of Admiral of the North and of the West were again distinct, though often held by the same man, until "Admirals of England" were appointed continuously from 1406. The titles "High Admiral" and "Lord Admiral" were both used, eventually combining in "Lord High Admiral". The Lord High Admiral did not originally have command at sea, but had jurisdiction over maritime affairs and the authority to establish courts of Admiralty.

During the reign of Henry VIII (1509–47) the English Navy had expanded to a point where it could not be managed by a single Lord High Admiral alone, therefore day-to-day management of the navy was handed over to a committee that later became known as the Navy Board. The navy board had Samuel Pepys as one of its members during the reign of Charles II (1660–85), and it ran side-by-side with the Board of Admiralty.

From the early 17th century onwards, when an individual Lord High Admiral was appointed, there was also a Council of the Lord High Admiral which assisted him to perform some of the duties of the Admiralty. When this office was not occupied by an individual, it was "put into commission" and exercised by a Board of Admiralty headed by a First Lord of the Admiralty; this was the usual arrangement from 1709 until it was merged with the Admiralty in 1832.

However, the office of Lord High Admiral, which—except for brief periods during its long history—had remained extant, was not abolished as an official naval post until 1964. In 1964, the office of First Lord of the Admiralty was also abolished and the functions of the Lords Commissioners of Admiralty were transferred to the new Admiralty Board becoming a sub-committee (Navy) of the tri-service Defence Council of the United Kingdom. The ancient title of Lord High Admiral was resumed, by the sovereign personally.

Elizabeth II held the title for the next 47 years, until in 2011 she conferred the office upon her husband, Prince Philip, Duke of Edinburgh to celebrate his 90th birthday. Philip had served in the Royal Navy during the Second World War, but he gave up a promising naval career to support Elizabeth as her consort.

Current status 
Upon Prince Philip's death in 2021, the holder of the office became obscure. It is unknown whether the office of Lord High Admiral reverted back to the Crown, or if it is currently vacant, in which case it remains as such until His Majesty either assumes it, or grants it upon someone else. The Ministry of Defence had confirmed they did not hold information on the issue, but suggested it had been resumed by the then Queen in right of the Crown. Upon Queen Elizabeth II's death in 2022, the office was reported to have been passed to King Charles III.

List of High Admirals

High Admirals of England, Ireland 1385–1512

Lord Admirals of England, 1512–1638

Lord High Admirals of England, 1638–1707

Lord High Admirals of Great Britain, 1707–1800
Before 1707 there was an office of Lord High Admiral of Scotland. Following the Act of Union 1707, all jurisdictions were placed under the office of Lord High Admiral of Great Britain.

Lord High Admirals of the United Kingdom, 1801–present

Former command flags

Tudor period

The earliest known instructions given to the Lord Admiral to fly command flags were given by King Henry VIII in 1545 the Lord Admiral was ordered to fly the flag of the arms of the King on the top of the main masthead with the flag of the cross of Saint George on the top of the front (fore) masthead.

See also
Lord High Admiral of Scotland
Lord High Admiral of the Wash
Lord High Admiral of Sweden
List of the First Lords of the Admiralty

References

Sources
 Houbraken,  Jacobus. Thoyras, Paul de Rapin. Vertue, George. (1747). The History of England, A List of Admirals of England (1224-1745). England. Kanpton. P and J.

 
Royal Navy
Royal Navy appointments
Lord High Admiral
Lord High Admiral